Vermilion is an album by the American band the Continental Drifters, released in 1999. It was first released in Germany, in 1998.

Production
The drummer Russ Broussard played on the album, replacing Carlo Nuccio. Vermilion was recorded in Maurice, Louisiana, at Dockside Studio.

Critical reception

Robert Christgau thought that "the lyrics resolve on home truisms, earned and learned but predictable nonetheless, just like the alt-pop songforms and country-rock groove," and singled out Susan Cowsill for praise. Trouser Press called the album "mature, artistic and affecting," writing that "the eight-minute 'Daddy Just Wants It to Rain' is a monumental and powerful piece of family autobiography." No Depression considered it "graceful, poetic, intimate and deliciously harmonized, but still plenty rock-minded."

CMJ New Music Report wrote that "touching country-gospel harmonies dominate this album, which taps deep into the soul of American roots music." Stereo Review's Sound & Vision opined that "guitarist Robert Mache is the unsung hero of the lot, putting a personal spin on the Neil Young/Robbie Robertson tradition of thrill-ride soloing." The Chicago Tribune declared that the album "vibrates with life, serving up roots rock in all its flavors: tough, tender, twangy, toe-tapping but with more urgency than the genre frequently exhibits (and without the complacency)." 

AllMusic called the sound "downright messy at times, with acoustic and electric guitars splayed out around indistinct bass and clattering drums and the occasional mandolin and rubboard."

Track listing

Personnel
Russ Broussard - drums
Susan Cowsill - vocals, guitar
Peter Holsapple - vocals, guitar
Robert Mache - guitar
Vicki Peterson - vocals, guitar
Mark Walton - bass

References

1999 albums
Razor & Tie albums